László Bartucz (born 5 November 1991) is a Hungarian handball player. He plays for Grundfos Tatabánya KC and the Hungarian national team.

Career

Club
László Bartucz started playing handball in Békéscsaba, then spent four seasons in the PLER KC. He was first entered here in 2008 for the adult NB1 match, but outside of this occasion he was only expected to play in the junior match. He had a regular opportunity to play for the Pécsi VSE from 2010, where he finished 9th in the playoffs after 11th place in the regular season. He then played for two seasons in Grundfos Tatabánya KC, in 2013 they could play for the bronze medal in the championship, but they lost the bronze match against Csurgói KK in 4th place. He also spent two seasons in the Ceglédi KKSE team belonging to the lower house of the championship. During his time here, he took part in a test drive at the German Rhein-Neckar Löwen, but in 2015, he finished 4th in the championship for Csurgói KK. He returned to Grundfos Tatabánya KC in the summer of 2018.

National team
He was a member of the Hungarian B-team, which was launched in 2014. He played his first match in the Hungarian national team on June 10, 2015, in the European Championship qualifying match against the Portuguese national team. After the Hungarian national team won its group in the qualifying series, it also became a member of the framework for the 2016 European Championships.

Honours

Club
Grundfos Tatabánya KC
Nemzeti Bajnokság I
: 2019, 2021
Magyar Kupa
: 2012

References

1991 births
Living people
Hungarian male handball players
People from Orosháza
Sportspeople from Békés County